Ape vs. Monster is a 2021 American science fiction monster film directed by Daniel Lusko and produced by The Asylum.

As the title suggests, this film is a mockbuster of Godzilla vs. Kong. The plot, however, borrows from the 1998 Godzilla film, Yonggary, and Rampage. It was released on April 30, 2021.

Plot 

A space capsule crashes back to Earth near Roswell, New Mexico; Dr. Linda Murphy, answering to National Security Advisor Ethan Marcos, takes control of the investigation. The craft is found to be from ELBE, a secret U.S.-Soviet space program that aimed to end the Cold War via establishing a joint first contact. Linda's father, Noah, was a lead scientist on the project, but they became estranged when he sent Abraham, a chimpanzee the young Linda befriended, into space as the capsule's pilot. The mission was declared a failure when Earth lost contact with the craft in 2007. Marcos orders Linda to investigate the site before the Russians learn of the capsule's return.

Linda and her friend, Undersecretary Reynolds, lead a team to the crash site. They discover that the capsule's occupant broke out following the landing, and the capsule is covered in a strange green fluid. Abraham, having grown several times larger, appears and kills Reynolds and the soldiers. Linda trips and is knocked unconscious, but sees another team led by her former classmate and Russian agent Eva Kuleshov arrive and tranquilize Abraham. Unnoticed by the humans, a Gila monster consumes some of the liquid at the site. At the Langley Research Center, Abraham is confined while Linda, Eva and a team of scientists attempt to understand his mutation. Back at the crash site, a group of soldiers left to guard the capsule are killed by the now-mutated, gigantic Gila. Marcos sends Linda and her assistant Jones to pursue the creature. Meanwhile, Eva discovers that the alien substance breaks down in Earth's atmosphere, leading her to covertly have the entire remaining supply injected into Abraham to stabilize it. Linda and Jones witness the Gila destroy a bridge and a passenger train before heading underground.

Abraham grows even larger and escapes from Langley. Linda, confused over his sudden further mutation, meets with Marcos and Eva, with Eva mentioning rumors that Abraham destroyed the Extraterrestrial Defense Initiative, a successor to the Strategic Defense Initiative. It is found that Abraham inhaled the substance over time while in the capsule, while the Gila directly consumed it. General Delaney, Reynolds' successor, orders the team to find the monsters as soon as possible. They track Abraham to Huntington, West Virginia, where Linda discovers the substance breaking down in blood he left behind, forcing Eva to admit her deception. Linda removes Eva from the team and joins a group of Special Forces soldiers who engage Abraham, but the men are all killed and Abraham flees. Eva disappears with an Apache helicopter.

Returning to Langley, Linda and Jones discover beams of cosmic energy transmitted from the Andromeda Galaxy are remotely controlling both monsters via the substance in their bodies. The Hubble Space Telescope discovers an alien ship approaching Earth, forcing Marcos to call Noah in to provide assistance. Linda finds that Abraham may be able to resist the aliens' control, and she, Jones and Noah plan to jam the alien signal using a transmitter. The transmitter is attached to the Washington Monument shortly before Abraham appears in the city, guided there to decapitate the U.S. government in preparation for a full-scale invasion. Its jamming signal quickly frees him, but the Gila monster is unaffected and emerges to wreak havoc. Despite Abraham no longer being a threat, Delaney orders a missile strike on him; this accidentally causes the Washington Monument to fall, killing Delaney and destroying the transmitter, thus allowing the aliens to regain control of Abraham.

Noah, having reconciled with Linda, discloses the existence of a prototype transmitter stored in a van in the city, and sends Linda and Jones to retrieve it. They find it, but Jones is killed by the Gila before she can repair it. Upon its activation, Abraham is again freed, and he battles the Gila to protect Linda. The Gila eventually gains the advantage over Abraham, but Eva is able to disorient the Gila with a suicide attack. Abraham recovers and beats the Gila, striking it several times before killing it by snapping its neck. Marcos sends in gunships to terminate Abraham, but changes his mind and decides to place faith in Linda's trust of Abraham, calling them off at the last minute.

In the aftermath, the alien ship retreats from Earth, while the fallen Gila's energy is fully neutralized. Abraham is sent to a facility outside Santa Fe, New Mexico, where he can live in peace. Marcos gives Linda exclusive rights to study him, and she accepts Noah's offer to join her.

Cast 
 Eric Roberts as National Security Advisor Ethan Marcos
 Arianna Scott as Dr. Linda Murphy
 Katie Sereika as Eva Kuleshov
 Shayne Hartigan as Lab Tech Jones / Blair
 Rudy Bentz as Noah Murphy
 Sir Gregory Salonis as St. Peterson / Harker
 R.J. Wagner as General Delaney

Release 
Ape vs. Monster was released on VOD on April 30, 2021. A DVD release by Greenfield Media followed on September 27, 2021. The film has only been released on Blu-ray in Germany.

Reception 
Ape vs. Monster was received generally poorly, receiving 2.1/10 stars on IMDb.

Sequel 
A sequel, titled Ape vs. Mecha Ape, is scheduled to release on March 24, 2023. In it, the United States military creates a giant mechanical ape, but it escapes and wreaks havoc, leading them to release the captive Abraham to neutralize the threat before it destroys downtown Chicago.

References

External links 

 

2020s English-language films
American monster movies
2020s fantasy adventure films
The Asylum films
Mockbuster films
Films set in Washington, D.C.
Kaiju films
2020s monster movies
2021 films
Films about size change
Giant monster films
Films about lizards
Films about apes
2020s American films